Not to be confused for the Weserstadion, in Bremen.

The Wersestadion is a multi-use stadium in Ahlen, Germany.  It is currently used mostly for football matches and is the home stadium of Rot Weiss Ahlen. The stadium is able to hold 12,500 people and was built in 1997.

External links
 Frank Jasperneite page

References

Football venues in Germany
Rot Weiss Ahlen
Warendorf (district)
Sports venues in North Rhine-Westphalia